Francis Hare may refer to:

Francis Hare (bishop) (1671–1740), English churchman and classical scholar
Francis Augustus Hare (1830–1892), a police officer in Victoria (Australia) who led the pursuit of Ned Kelly and his gang
Francis W. E. Hare  (1858–1928), Irish physician and low-carbohydrate diet advocate
Francis Hare, 6th Earl of Listowel (born 1964), Irish and British peer

See also
Francis Hare-Naylor (1753–1815), English historical author